The 2013 Major League Baseball First-Year Player Draft was held from June 6 through June 8, 2013. The first two rounds were broadcast from Studio 42 of the MLB Network in Secaucus, New Jersey.

Each team received one selection per round, going in reverse order of the 2012 MLB season final standings. In addition, teams could receive compensation draft picks if they had made a qualifying offer to a free agent player from their team, and the player rejected the offer and signed with another team.

Draft order
The Washington Nationals, Atlanta Braves, Milwaukee Brewers, and Los Angeles Angels of Anaheim all surrendered their first round picks by signing players who had received and rejected qualifying offers from their previous teams: Rafael Soriano, B. J. Upton, Kyle Lohse, and Josh Hamilton, respectively. The Cleveland Indians, whose first round pick was protected as it fell in the top ten, lost their second round pick and a pick in the sandwich round between the second and third rounds for signing two players who received qualifying offers: Nick Swisher and Michael Bourn.

First round

Compensatory round

Competitive Balance Round A

Other notable selections

Notes
Compensation picks

Traded picks

NCAA investigation
The Philadelphia Phillies selected college juniors Ben Wetzler of Oregon State University in the fifth round and Jason Monda of Washington State University in the sixth round of the draft. Both entered into negotiations with the Phillies with the help of a financial adviser, which is against National Collegiate Athletic Association rules. Both also chose to return to college for their senior year. The Phillies reported Wetzler and Monda to the NCAA, which cleared Monda and suspended Wetzler for the first 11 games of the college season.

Player notes

Kyle Crockett, the Cleveland Indians fourth round pick out of the University of Virginia, was promoted to the Indians on May 16, 2014.  This made Crockett the first 2013 draftee to reach the major leagues.

Marco Gonzales, the St. Louis Cardinals' first round pick, made his MLB debut on June 25, 2014.
This made Gonzales the first 2013 first round pick to reach the major leagues.

Nate Orf, who went undrafted out of Baylor University in 2013, signed with the Milwaukee Brewers for $500 and worked his way up through their farm system, making his MLB debut with them on July 2, 2018. His first hit two days later turned out to be the game-winning home run and he was carried back out by his teammates for a curtain call.

See also

List of first overall Major League Baseball draft picks

References

External links
Major League Baseball Draft Official Site
2013 Major League Baseball Draft at ESPN

Major League Baseball draft
Draft
Major League Baseball draft
Major League Baseball draft
Baseball in New Jersey
Events in New Jersey
Sports in Hudson County, New Jersey
Secaucus, New Jersey